The 2016 Horizon League men's soccer tournament was the 29th edition of the tournament. It determined the Horizon League's automatic berth into the 2016 NCAA Division I Men's Soccer Championship. UIC enter the tournament as the defending champions.

The 2016 final was a repeat of last year's final. The UIC Flames took on the Wright State Raiders in the championship, where the Flames, once again, came out on top. UIC's Oscar Rivero scored the game-winning goal off of a corner kick in the 85th minute to seal the fifth-ever title for the Flames. It was Wright State's third-consecutive trip to the Horizon League final, and third-consecutive defeat in the final.

The semifinals and finals of the tournament was hosted by Wright State University and all matches were contested at Wright State Alumni Field.

Seeds
The top four teams participate in the tournament. The seeding is based on the program's conference record during the 2016 Horizon League season.

Cleveland State also had 4–3–2 conference records but a poorer record against Green Bay and Valparaiso

Bracket

Results

Quarterfinals

Semifinals

Final

Awards

See also 
 2016 Horizon League men's soccer season
 2016 NCAA Division I men's soccer season
 2016 NCAA Division I Men's Soccer Championship
 Horizon League Men's Soccer Tournament

References 

Horizon League Men's Soccer Tournament
Horizon League Men's Soccer